Sulochana ("one with beautiful eyes") is a popular Indian feminine given name, and may refer to:

People 
 Sulochana Brahaspati (born 1937), Indian vocalist of Hindustani classical music
 Sulochana Chavan (1933–2022), Marathi singer known for singing lavanis
 Sulochana Gadgil (born 1944), Indian climatologist, mathematician, meteorologist and oceanographer
 Sulochana Latkar (born 1928), actress in Marathi and Hindi cinema, often billed simply as Sulochana
 Sulochana Manandhar (born 1955), Nepali poet, writer, columnist and political activist
 Sulochana, stage name of Ruby Myers (1907–1983), Indian silent film star

Films 
 Sati Sulochana (1921 film), a silent Marathi film directed by G.V. Sane
 Sati Sulochana, the first 1934 Kannada-language "talkie", directed by Y. V. Rao
 Sulochana, Tamil film produced by Modern Theatres
 Sati Sulochana (1961 film), Telugu film directed by Rajanikanth Sabnavis, starring N. T. Rama Rao
 Sati Sulochana (1969 film), directed by S. N. Tripathi

Others 
 Sulochana, an epic poem by Nepali author Laxmi Prasad Devkota
 Sulochana (Ramayana), the daughter of Shesha, married to Indrajit, in the Hindu epic Ramayana
 Sulochana (सुलोचनः) is one of Vishnu's '1000 names' (see: Vishnu Sahasranāma)
 Sulochana is the name of Yakshini from a list of thirty six yakshinis given in the Uddamareshvara Tantra (Sulochana (Beautiful Eyes): She gives Paduka Siddhi, enabling one to travel at great speed through the aethers)
 Sulochana das prabhu was a devotee of ISKCON who protested against guru Kirtanananda Swami and promised to kill him for his sins (pedophilia, homosexuality etc), but was killed instead by Tirtha das prabhu, who believed Kirtananda was a saint to be protected.

Hindu given names
Indian feminine given names